The culture of San Diego, California is influenced heavily by American and Mexican cultures due to its position as a border town, its large Hispanic population, and its history as part of Spanish America and Mexico. San Diego's longtime association with the U.S. military also contributes to its culture. Present-day culture includes many historical and tourist attractions, a thriving musical and theatrical scene, numerous notable special events, a varied cuisine, and a reputation as one of America's premier centers of craft brewing.

Tourism

Tourism has affected the city's culture, as San Diego houses many tourist attractions, such as SeaWorld, Aquatica San Diego, the San Diego Zoo, San Diego Wild Animal Park, Belmont Park, Balboa Park, and nearby Legoland. San Diego's Spanish influence can be seen in the many historic sites across the city, such as the Mission San Diego de Alcala, Old Town San Diego State Historic Park, and Balboa Park. Cuisine in San Diego is diverse, but there is an abundance of wood fired California-style pizzas, and Mexican and East Asian cuisine.  Annual events in San Diego include Comic-Con, the San Diego/Del Mar Fair, San Diego Pride, and Street Scene Music Festival.

Military
San Diego has been a military town for more than 100 years. Present-day reflections of that tradition include tributes to military history such as the USS Midway Museum and Fort Rosecrans National Cemetery, as well as numerous smaller memorials throughout the city. Annual events celebrating the military include Fleet Week and the Miramar Air Show.

Cuisine

Food

Because of its ethnic and cultural mix, San Diego has a wide range of cuisines. One can find Mexican, Italian, French, Spanish, Filipino, Vietnamese, Greek, Latin, German, Indian, Central and East Asian, Middle Eastern and Pacific Islander food throughout the city. In addition, there are numerous seafood restaurants and steakhouses. The city's long history and close proximity to Mexico has endowed the area with an extensive variety of authentic Mexican restaurants. Regional homemade specialties, border fare and haute cuisine are all readily available.

San Diego's warm, dry climate and access to the ocean have also made it a center for fishing and for growing fruits and vegetables. Long a center of the tuna industry, San Diego benefits from an abundant supply of seafood.

Many of the most popular restaurants can be found in the Gaslamp Quarter, Little Italy, La Jolla, Hillcrest and Old Town.

Local specialties include:
 Mexican (carne asada, street tacos, California burritos, fish tacos, enchiladas, carne asada fries, and ceviche)
 Wood-fired, California-style pizza
 Southeast Asian specialties of all kinds
 Seafood of all kinds
 Local wines (San Pasqual Valley, Rancho Bernardo, Julian)
 Locally produced (from the mountains near Julian) hard and sweet apple cider and Julian apple pie
 Various fruits and vegetables (including avocados, tomatoes, mushrooms, olives, eggplant, oranges, lemons, limes, strawberries, grapefruit, grapes, apples, pomegranates, persimmons, and melons)

Several chain restaurants made their start in San Diego. These include Jack in the Box (1951), Pat & Oscar's (1991), Souplantation (March 1978), Rubio's (1983), Roberto's Taco Shop (1964), Alberto's (1975), and Anthony's Fish Grotto (1946).

Beer

San Diego County has a vibrant craft brewing community featuring more than 100 active local brewpubs and/or microbreweries. The city and county of San Diego are sometimes referred to as "America's craft beer capital". San Diego was listed first in the "Top Five Beer Towns in the U.S." by Men's Journal, and the Full Pint said that San Diego is "one of the country's premier craft beer destinations" with a "thriving brewing culture". San Diego brewers have pioneered several specialty beer styles, most notably the American Double India Pale Ale (Double IPA).  Three San Diego County breweries are consistently rated in the Top 10 breweries in the world: AleSmith Brewing Company, Pizza Port/Port Brewing Company/Lost Abbey, and Stone Brewing Co.

None of San Diego's original 20th century breweries (such as Aztec Brewing Company which was closed in 1953) survived the spread of big national brewing companies. The first of the new wave of local breweries and brewpubs was the Karl Strauss Brewing Company which opened in 1989. A second wave of microbrew companies was led by Port, Stone (now the largest local brewer) and Alesmith. Annual events celebrating San Diego's beer culture include San Diego Beer Week in November and numerous local craft beer festivals.

Arts 
San Diego has a small, but growing art scene. "Kettner Nights" at the Art and Design District in Little Italy has art and design exhibitions throughout many retail design stores and galleries on selected Friday nights. "Ray at Night" at North Park host a variety of small scale art galleries on the second Saturday evening of each month. La Jolla and nearby Solana Beach also have a variety of art galleries.

Several art museums, such as the San Diego Museum of Art, the Timken Gallery, the Mingei International Museum featuring folk art, the Museum of Photographic Arts, and the Museum of the Living Artist are located in Balboa Park. The Museum of Contemporary Art San Diego (MCASD) is located in an ocean front building in La Jolla and has a branch located at the Santa Fe Depot downtown.

Balboa Park hosts dozens of museums and gardens, including the Museum of Man, the San Diego Natural History Museum, the Reuben H. Fleet Science Center, and the San Diego Air & Space Museum (formerly the Aerospace Museum). The San Diego Children's Museum is located downtown. The Columbia district on San Diego Bay is home to the Star of India and seven other floating museum ships and boats belonging to the San Diego Maritime Museum, as well as the unrelated San Diego Aircraft Carrier Museum featuring the aircraft carrier USS Midway.

Media

Many novels, films and television shows take place in San Diego. Almost Famous, Bring It On, Citizen Kane, Some Like It Hot, Top Gun and its sequel were set in and filmed there. Hotel del Coronado, Balboa Park and Downtown San Diego have been the filming location for multiple films and television shows.

Music
The San Diego Symphony performs on a regular basis at Symphony Towers and other venues. The San Diego Opera at Civic Center Plaza, directed by Ian Campbell, was ranked by Opera America as one of the top 10 opera companies in the United States. The San Diego Master Chorale performs both alone and with the San Diego Symphony. Other musical organizations include the La Jolla Symphony and Chorus, La Jolla Music Society, the Greater San Diego Chamber Orchestra, the San Diego Concert Band, and the music departments of San Diego State University, University of California at San Diego, University of San Diego, and Point Loma Nazarene College. Free concerts of organ music are presented regularly at the Spreckels Organ Pavilion, the world's largest outdoor pipe organ, in Balboa Park.

San Diego boasts one of the most eclectic local music scenes in California. Once dubbed the "Next Seattle" during the independent rock craze of the early to mid-1990s, San Diego's clubs and cafe's have produced such pioneering rock acts as Blink-182, Stone Temple Pilots, Pierce the Veil, P.O.D., Switchfoot, As I Lay Dying, Three Mile Pilot, Rocket From the Crypt, Pinback, Thingy, Drive Like Jehu, Unbroken, Swing Kids, Creedle, Battalion of Saints, Manual Scan, Beat Farmers, The Paladins, The Bigfellas, Morlocks, Crash Worship, Greyboy Allstars, Boilermaker, The Black Heart Procession, The Album Leaf, Tristeza, and Pitchfork, among countless others. Singer-songwriter Erika Davies is a notable lounge music local act.

Theater
The Old Globe Theatre at Balboa Park has been in operation for more than 70 years and produces about 15 plays and musicals annually. The La Jolla Playhouse at UCSD produces both original and touring works and is directed by Christopher Ashley. Both the Old Globe Theatre and the La Jolla Playhouse have produced the world premieres of plays and musicals that have gone on to win Tony Awards on Broadway. More than three dozen local productions have gone on to Broadway; four have won one or more Tonys.  In 1984 the Old Globe Theatre received the Tony Award for best regional theater, and the La Jolla Playhouse received the same award in 1993. The Joan B. Kroc Theatre at Kroc Center's Performing Arts Center is a 600-seat state-of-the-art theatre that hosts music, dance and theatre performances. The San Diego Repertory Theatre at the Lyceum Theatres in Horton Plaza produces a variety of plays and musicals. Serving the northeastern part of San Diego is the California Center for the Arts in Escondido, a 400-seat performing arts theater. Other professional theatrical production companies include the Lyric Opera San Diego, specializing in comic operas, operettas, and musical comedies, and the Starlight Musical Theatre, presenting musical comedies in the outdoor Starlight Bowl. Both the Lyric Opera and Starlight sought bankruptcy protection in 2011 and are currently inactive. Starlight is now under new management and being rebuilt to operate as an event space. www.savestarlight.org There are also numerous semiprofessional and amateur theatrical productions throughout the year by such groups as the Cygnet Theatre, Christian Community Theater, Vanguard Theater, Lamb's Players Theater, Diversionary Theatre, and San Diego Junior Theatre.

Cultural Enclaves in San Diego

Sites of interest

Balboa Park
Birch Aquarium at the Scripps Institution of Oceanography
Black's Beach (nude beach) at Torrey Pines State Park in La Jolla
Cabrillo National Monument in Point Loma
Casa de Estudillo, in Old Town San Diego State Historic Park *
Hotel del Coronado in nearby Coronado *
Legoland in nearby Carlsbad
MCAS Miramar Marine Corps Air Station (Miramar Airshow)
Mission Beach Roller Coaster at Belmont Park in Mission Beach
Mission San Diego de Alcalá *
Mission Trails Regional Park
Mount Soledad at La Jolla
Old Globe Theatre at Balboa Park
Old Mission Dam in Mission Trails Regional Park *
Old Town San Diego State Historic Park
Presidio of San Diego *
San Diego Wild Animal Park in nearby Escondido
San Diego Zoo at Balboa Park
Seaport Village in the Marina District downtown
SeaWorld at Mission Bay
Sesame Place in Chula Vista
Star of India (barque sailing ship) on San Diego Bay in the Columbia district downtown *
USS Midway aircraft carrier museum on San Diego Bay in the Columbia district downtown
(* An asterisk designates National Historic Landmarks)

Annual events
 
Adams Avenue Roots Festival in Normal Heights
Adams Avenue Street Fair in Normal Heights
America's Finest City Half Marathon
Art Walk, the largest art event in the San Diego region in Little Italy
Art Walk on the bay in the Marina district
Asian Film Festival
Cabrillo Festival commemorates the discovery of San Diego Bay by Juan Rodriguez Cabrillo
Carnevale, a Venetian mask and costume competition in Little Italy
ConDor - San Diego's Oldest SF&Fantasy Convention
Comic-Con
Farmers Insurance Open Golf Tournament at Torrey Pines Golf Course
Festivale Siciliano in Little Italy
Fleet Week
Gator by the Bay Zydeco & Blues Festival
Holiday Bowl 
Horrible Imaginings Film Festival
Jewish Film Festival
¡Latin Food Fest!
Latino Film Festival
MCAS Miramar Air Show
Italian Motorsport Show in Little Italy
Oceanside International Film Festival in Oceanside
Open Air Book Fair in Hillcrest
Over-the-line at Fiesta Island
Parade of Lights on San Diego Bay in December
Portuguese U.P.S.E.S. Festa and Parade throughout neighborhoods of Point Loma
Precious Festa, the largest Italian festival in the Western U.S. in Little Italy
San Diego Crew Classic on Mission Bay
San Diego/Del Mar Fair in the nearby city of Del Mar.
San Diego Film Week
San Diego International Film Festival
San Diego Pride parade and festival in Hillcrest
Street Scene Music Festival
San Diego Underground Film Festival

See also
Media in San Diego
Museums in San Diego
City of San Diego Commission for Arts and Culture

References